Il Moro is Italian for "The Moor", and  may refer to:

 Ludovico Sforza, (1452–1508) Duke of Milan
 Alessandro de' Medici, Duke of Florence, (1510–1537)
 Francesco Torbido, (1486–1562) Venetian Renaissance painter

Nicknames
Nicknames of politicians